Artyom Nikolayevich Garifulin (born October 9, 1990) is a Russian professional ice hockey player. He is currently playing with Diables Rouges de Briançon of the Ligue Magnus.

Garifulin made his Kontinental Hockey League debut playing with Metallurg Novokuznetsk during the 2014–15 KHL season.

References

External links

1990 births
Living people
KRS Heilongjiang players
Metallurg Novokuznetsk players
Russian ice hockey forwards
Sportspeople from Yaroslavl
Zauralie Kurgan players